Unusually Thicke is a Canadian-American mockumentary television series, which premiered in 2014. Billed as a "reality-sitcom hybrid", the series combines a reality television format with improvisational comedy to present a fictionalized portrayal of the family life of actor Alan Thicke.

The core cast consists of Thicke, his wife Tanya Callau and his teenage son Carter. His adult sons, businessman Brennan Thicke and pop singer Robin Thicke, make some appearances but are not full-time cast members. Guest performers in the series have included Bob Saget, David Hasselhoff, Wayne Gretzky, John Stamos, Bill Maher and Thicke's former Growing Pains co-stars Joanna Kerns, Jeremy Miller and Tracey Gold.

Produced by Canadian firm Peacock Alley Entertainment, the series aired on Pop in the United States and Slice in Canada.

In June 2014, after the series completed its first season run, its renewal for a second season was announced. The series garnered a Canadian Screen Award nomination for Best Reality/Competition Program or Series at the 3rd Canadian Screen Awards.

The second season aired in Canada under the title Unusually Thicke: Under Construction, and centred on Thicke and his family doing a renovation project on their home. In Canada, Under Construction aired on HGTV in 2015, although in the United States it aired on Pop under the original Unusually Thicke title beginning in September 2016.

Thicke died of a heart attack on December 13, 2016, soon after the second season completed its U.S. television run. Pop subsequently announced plans to rerun the entire series between December 19 and December 23 in tribute to Thicke. Peacock Alley initially left open the possibility that the show could continue production with the focus shifted to other surviving family members, but no further episodes of the show have been produced.

Episode list

Season 1
1. Hoarders
2. The Anniversary
3. Rockin' Robin
4. A Growing Pain in the Butt
5. The Thickenator
6. Walk of Shame
7. Hockey Night in Miami
8. Party House Rules
9. Off the Grid
10. Summer Jobs
11. The Naked Truth
12. Empty Nest
13. Par for the Course
14. Baby Talk

Season 2
15. Cell Mates
16. The Promposal
17. Different Strokes
18. Tattoo You
19. Silence of the Goats
20. Last Tango
21. Gilbert Gets a Rash
22. Home and Native Land
23. No Ifs, and or Butts
24. The Road Warrior
25. Father of the Bribe
26. All Shook Up
27. Growing Strains
28. Bucket List

References

External links

 

2014 American television series debuts
2014 Canadian television series debuts
2010s American mockumentary television series
2010s Canadian satirical television series
Slice (TV channel) original programming
HGTV (Canada) original programming
2015 American television series endings
2015 Canadian television series endings
Pop (American TV channel) original programming